Rhinopalpa polynice, the wizard, is a nymphalid butterfly found in India and South Asia, and is the only species in the genus Rhinopalpa.

Gallery

References and external links

Rhinopalpa polynice at Tree of Life

Kallimini
Monotypic butterfly genera
Taxa named by Baron Cajetan von Felder
Taxa named by Rudolf Felder